Calocalanus elegans is a species of calanoid copepod in the family Paracalanidae. It is found in Europe.

References

Calanoida
Articles created by Qbugbot
Animals described in 1965